The 2018 ICC Women's World Twenty20 was the sixth edition of the ICC Women's World Twenty20, hosted in the West Indies from 9 to 24 November 2018. It the second World Twenty20 hosted by the West Indies (after the 2010 edition), and the West Indies were the defending champions.

The tournament was awarded to the West Indies Cricket Board (WICB) at the 2013 annual conference of the International Cricket Council (ICC). The tournament's dates were confirmed at an ICC board meeting in January 2015. In February 2017, the ICC confirmed that this would be the first T20 tournament that uses the Decision Review System, with one review per side.

The qualifier tournament for the competition was held in July 2018 in the Netherlands. Both Bangladesh and Ireland won their respective semi-final matches in the qualifier, to advance to the Women's World Twenty20 tournament.

The first match scheduled to be played in Saint Lucia, between England and Sri Lanka, was abandoned due to rain. With further rain forecast in Saint Lucia, the ICC looked at a contingency plan of moving other group games to Antigua. The following day, the ICC confirmed that the Group A matches would remain in Saint Lucia. The ICC cited logistical issues and cost as the main factors for not moving the fixtures.

Australia in Group B qualified for the semi-finals, with their win against New Zealand, to give them three wins from three matches. India, also in Group B, qualified for the semi-finals, after they beat Ireland by 52 runs, with three wins from three matches. In Group A, tournament hosts the West Indies, along with England, progressed to the semi-finals, after wins in their penultimate group-stage fixtures. In the first semi-final, the West Indies faced Australia, with England and India playing each other in the second semi-final. Australia beat the West Indies by 71 runs and England beat India by 8 wickets to progress to the final.

Australia won their fourth title after beating England in the final by 8 wickets. Meg Lanning, captain of the Australian team said that the victory was "the most satisfying win I've been involved in" adding that "there will be some big celebrations". England's captain, Heather Knight, said that the team did not post a competitive total, but was "proud of the girls for reaching another world final". Australia's Alyssa Healy was named the player of the tournament.

Teams and qualification
Eight teams qualified automatically and they were joined by two teams from the qualifier tournament.

Squads

On 10 October 2018 the ICC confirmed all the squads for the tournament.

Venues
In January 2018, the ICC announced that three venues would be hosting matches:

Match officials
On 25 October 2018, the ICC appointed the officials for the tournament. Along with the twelve umpires, Richie Richardson and Graeme Labrooy were also named as the match referees.

 Gregory Brathwaite
 Kim Cotton
 Shaun George
 Wayne Knights
 Nitin Menon
 Sam Nogajski

 Claire Polosak
 Ahsan Raza
 Sue Redfern
 Langton Rusere
 Sharfuddoula
 Jacqueline Williams

Prize money
The International Cricket Council declared a total prize money pool of US$750,000 for the tournament, an increase from the $400,000 for the 2016 event. The prize money was allocated according to the performance of the team as follows:

Group stage
The fixtures for the tournament were confirmed in June 2018. All times are given in Eastern Caribbean Time (UTC-04:00)

Group A

Group B

Knockout stage

Semi-finals

Final

Statistics

Most runs

Most wickets

Team of the tournament 
On 25 November 2018, ICC announced its team of the tournament. The selection panel consisted of Ian Bishop, Anjum Chopra, Ebony Rainford-Brent, Melinda Farrell and Geoff Allardice.

  Alyssa Healy
  Smriti Mandhana
  Amy Jones (wk)
  Harmanpreet Kaur (c)
  Deandra Dottin
  Javeria Khan
  Ellyse Perry
  Leigh Kasperek
  Anya Shrubsole
  Kirstie Gordon
  Poonam Yadav
  Jahanara Alam (12th woman)

References

Notes

Further reading

External links
 Series home at ESPN Cricinfo

 
2018 in West Indian cricket
2018 in women's cricket
International cricket competitions in 2018–19
International women's cricket competitions in the West Indies
November 2018 sports events in North America
November 2018 sports events in South America